Dr Chau Chak Wing Building is a business school building of the University of Technology Sydney in Sydney, New South Wales, Australia. It is the first building in Australia designed by Canadian American architect Frank Gehry.

Description
The tower is named after Chau Chak Wing, a Chinese businessman who donated $20 million for the building's construction. The "Dr" in the building's name refers to honorary doctorates that have been conferred on Mr Chau. The 13-storey tower provides teaching, learning, research and office accommodation for, approximately, 1,256 students and 326 academic staff. The building's design is based on the idea of a tree-house structure.

The building's façade, which was made of 320,000 custom designed bricks, is described as the "squashed brown paper bag". Frank Gehry said, "Maybe it's a brown paper bag, but it's flexible on the inside, there's a lot of room for changes or movement."

An entrance from The Goods Line – a pedestrian pathway – is located on the eastern border of the site.

Construction

Early works on site and archaeological excavation were carried out from late 2011 until early 2012. The building was constructed by Lend Lease Group which was appointed in November 2012.

Construction of the building started in late 2012.
The building structure was topped-out in December 2013 and construction was completed in November 2014. The official opening took place on 2 February 2015.

Awards
The building has won the following awards: 
2015 AIQS Innovation Project Award
2015 Australian Timber Design Award People's Choice Award
2015 Good Design Awards: Product Design Hardware and Building
2015 Think Brick Awards: Horbury Hunt Commercial Award
2015 Master Builders Association NSW Awards: Tertiary Buildings Construction over $100m
2016 Australia Engineering Excellence Awards Bradfield Award

See also

 Buildings and architecture of Sydney
 List of works by Frank Gehry

References

External links
 Dr Chau Chak Wing Building at UTS website
 Dr Chau Chak Wing Building design

Buildings and structures in Sydney
University of Technology Sydney
Frank Gehry buildings
Buildings and structures completed in 2014
2014 establishments in Australia
University and college buildings in Australia